The House Order of the Wendish Crown was an Order of the House of Mecklenburg, jointly instituted on 12 May 1864 by Grand Duke Friedrich Franz II of Mecklenburg-Schwerin and Grand Duke Friedrich Wilhelm of Mecklenburg-Strelitz.

Classes 
The Order had four classes:
 Grand Cross in two sub-classes, with the Crown in Gold and, more exclusively, with the Crown in Ore 
 Grand Commander
 Commander
 Knight/Dame

Gold and silver Merit Crosses were also given.

Notable recipients

Grand Crosses

 Prince Aage, Count of Rosenborg
 Abdulaziz
 Prince Adalbert of Prussia (1811–1873)
 Prince Adalbert of Prussia (1884–1948)
 Adolf II, Prince of Schaumburg-Lippe
 Duke Adolf Friedrich of Mecklenburg
 Adolphus Frederick VI, Grand Duke of Mecklenburg-Strelitz
 Adolphus Frederick V, Grand Duke of Mecklenburg-Strelitz
 Albert, 8th Prince of Thurn and Taxis
 Prince Albert of Prussia (1809–1872)
 Prince Albert of Saxe-Altenburg
 Prince Albert of Prussia (1837–1906)
 Alexander I of Yugoslavia
 Alexander III of Russia
 Alexander of Battenberg
 Prince Alexander of Hesse and by Rhine
 Prince Alexander of Prussia
 Princess Alexandra of Hanover (born 1882)
 Alexandrine of Mecklenburg-Schwerin
 Alexis, Prince of Bentheim and Steinfurt
 Prince Alfons of Bavaria
 Alfred, Duke of Saxe-Coburg and Gotha
 Alfred, 2nd Prince of Montenuovo
 Princess Altinaï of Montenegro
 Grand Duchess Anastasia Mikhailovna of Russia
 Prince Aribert of Anhalt
 Prince Arthur, Duke of Connaught and Strathearn
 Alexander Cambridge, 1st Earl of Athlone
 Otto von Bismarck
 Borwin, Duke of Mecklenburg
 Walther Bronsart von Schellendorff
 Bernhard von Bülow
 Karl von Bülow
 Adolphus Cambridge, 1st Marquess of Cambridge
 Leo von Caprivi
 Carol I of Romania
 Charles I of Austria
 Charles Augustus, Hereditary Grand Duke of Saxe-Weimar-Eisenach (1844–1894)
 Charles Michael, Duke of Mecklenburg
 Chlodwig, Prince of Hohenlohe-Schillingsfürst
 Christian IX of Denmark
 Christian X of Denmark
 Duke Constantine Petrovich of Oldenburg
 Adolf von Deines
 Rudolf von Delbrück
 Eduard, Duke of Anhalt
 Edward VII
 Edward VIII
 Prince Edward of Saxe-Weimar
 Prince Eitel Friedrich of Prussia
 Emma of Waldeck and Pyrmont
 Ernest Louis, Grand Duke of Hesse
 Ernst I, Duke of Saxe-Altenburg
 Ernst II, Duke of Saxe-Altenburg
 Archduke Franz Ferdinand of Austria
 Frederick VIII of Denmark
 Frederick IX of Denmark
 Frederick Francis II, Grand Duke of Mecklenburg-Schwerin
 Frederick Francis III, Grand Duke of Mecklenburg-Schwerin
 Frederick Francis IV, Grand Duke of Mecklenburg-Schwerin
 Frederick I, Duke of Anhalt
 Frederick I, Grand Duke of Baden
 Frederick III, German Emperor
 Prince Frederick of Hohenzollern-Sigmaringen
 Frederick William, Elector of Hesse
 Frederick William, Grand Duke of Mecklenburg-Strelitz
 Friedrich II, Duke of Anhalt
 Prince Friedrich Leopold of Prussia
 Archduke Friedrich, Duke of Teschen
 Georg Alexander, Duke of Mecklenburg
 George I of Greece
 George V of Hanover
 George V
 Prince George of Prussia
 Prince Gustav of Denmark
 Haakon VII of Norway
 Prince Harald of Denmark
 Prince Heinrich of Hesse and by Rhine
 Prince Henry of Prussia (1862–1929)
 Heinrich VII, Prince Reuss of Köstritz
 Duke Henry of Mecklenburg-Schwerin
 Prince Hermann of Saxe-Weimar-Eisenach (1825–1901)
 Paul von Hindenburg
 Dietrich von Hülsen-Haeseler
 Archduchess Ilona of Austria
 Prince Joachim of Prussia
 Prince Johann of Schleswig-Holstein-Sonderburg-Glücksburg
 Duke John Albert of Mecklenburg
 Juliana of the Netherlands
 Georg von Kameke
 Karl Theodor, Duke in Bavaria
 Prince Kitashirakawa Yoshihisa
 Knud, Hereditary Prince of Denmark
 Grand Duke Konstantin Konstantinovich of Russia
 Konstantin of Hohenlohe-Schillingsfürst
 Leopold II of Belgium
 Leopold IV, Prince of Lippe
 Prince Leopold, Duke of Albany
 Leopold, Hereditary Prince of Anhalt
 Prince Leopold of Bavaria
 Alexander von Linsingen
 Ewald von Lochow
 Louis IV, Grand Duke of Hesse
 Louis Ferdinand, Prince of Prussia
 Archduke Ludwig Viktor of Austria
 Luís I of Portugal
 Edwin Freiherr von Manteuffel
 Prince Maximilian of Baden
 Duke William of Mecklenburg-Schwerin
 Emperor Meiji
 Grand Duke Michael Alexandrovich of Russia
 Milan I of Serbia
 Prince Mirko of Montenegro
 Helmuth von Moltke the Elder
 Prince Moritz of Saxe-Altenburg
 Nicholas II of Russia
 Grand Duke Nicholas Nikolaevich of Russia (1831–1891)
 Nicholas, Crown Prince of Montenegro
 Prince Oskar of Prussia
 Pakubuwono X
 Alexander August Wilhelm von Pape
 Duke Paul Frederick of Mecklenburg (1882–1904)
 Duke Paul Frederick of Mecklenburg
 Paul Frederick, Grand Duke of Mecklenburg-Schwerin
 Boris Petrovitch Njegosh
 Philipp, Prince of Eulenburg
 Hans von Plessen
 Karl von Plettenberg
 Prince Friedrich Wilhelm of Prussia
 Antoni Wilhelm Radziwiłł
 Archduke Rainer Ferdinand of Austria
 Duke Robert of Württemberg
 Albrecht von Roon
 Prince Rudolf of Liechtenstein
 Rudolf, Crown Prince of Austria
 Rupprecht, Crown Prince of Bavaria
 Alfred von Schlieffen
 Gustav von Senden-Bibran
 Otto Graf zu Stolberg-Wernigerode
 Ludwig Freiherr von und zu der Tann-Rathsamhausen
 Prince Valdemar of Denmark
 Julius von Verdy du Vernois
 Grand Duke Vladimir Alexandrovich of Russia
 Alfred von Waldersee
 Wilhelm II, German Emperor
 Wilhelmina of the Netherlands
 William II of Württemberg
 William Ernest, Grand Duke of Saxe-Weimar-Eisenach
 Prince William of Baden (1829–1897)
 William, Prince of Hohenzollern
 William, Prince of Wied
 Friedrich Graf von Wrangel
 Ferdinand von Zeppelin

Grand Commanders 

 Theodor Thierfelder

Commanders 

 Friedrich Wilhelm Schirrmacher

Knights 

 Hermann Rudolph Aubert
 Prince August Wilhelm of Prussia
 Paul von Buri
 Gunther von Etzel
 Theodor Fontane
 Frank Linke-Crawford
 Friedrich Wigger

Dames 

 Princess Alexandra of Hanover (born 1882)
 Grand Duchess Anastasia Mikhailovna of Russia
 Duchess Cecilie of Mecklenburg-Schwerin
 Duchess Elisabeth Alexandrine of Mecklenburg-Schwerin
 Princess Elisabeth Sybille of Saxe-Weimar-Eisenach
 Duchess Marie Antoinette of Mecklenburg
 Duchess Marie of Mecklenburg-Schwerin

Unknown class 

 Alexander Barclay de Tolly-Weymarn
 Ludwig Brunow
 Joseph Hollman
 Hans von Kaltenborn-Stachau
 Julius Kühn
 Friedrich Ladegast
 Helmuth von Moltke the Younger

References

External links
 
 House Order of the Wendish Crown

Orders, decorations, and medals of Mecklenburg-Schwerin
Orders, decorations, and medals of Mecklenburg-Strelitz